Eilean Ruairidh Mòr is a forested island in Loch Maree, Wester Ross, Scotland. Its name was formerly anglicised as "Ellan-Rorymore".

The island is owned by Forestry and Land Scotland, as is the Slattadale Forest on the southern shore of Loch Maree. The islands in Loch Maree are among the least disturbed in Britain and are managed as a national nature reserve.

History
Eilean Ruairidh Mòr was planted with pines in about 1815. There are remains of a subterranean circular structure, similar to a Scandinavian dùn or burgh. The ancestors of the Mackenzies of Gairloch held it as a place of security from the attacks of the Macleods.

Footnotes

Islands of Loch Maree
Uninhabited islands of Highland (council area)